Cadi Ayyad University ( jāmiʿat al-qāḍī ʿayyāḍ) is a university in Marrakesh and one of the largest universities in Morocco. One of its associated colleges, the École nationale des sciences appliquées de Marrakech (ENSA Marrakech), was created in 2000 by the Ministry of Higher Education and specializes in engineering and scientific research. Cadi Ayyad University was established in 1978 and operates 13 institutions in the Marrakesh-Safi region of Morocco in four main cities, including Kalaa of Sraghna, Essaouira and Safi in addition to Marrakesh.

Branches of study 
Cadi Ayyad University has established, since 1978, 13 institutions, which are: 
 Faculty of Sciences Semlalia FSSM (1978–79)
 Faculty of Letters and Human Sciences  (1978–79)
 Faculty of Law, Economic and Social Sciences FSJES (1978–79)
 Faculty of Sciences and Techniques FST (1991–92)
 Faculty of  Medicine and Pharmacie FMPM
 National School of  Applied Sciences ENSA-M
 National School of Commerce and Management ENCG (2004–05)
 Ecole Normale Supérieure ENS in Marrakesh
 Ecole Supérieure de Technologie in Essaouira ESTE
 University Center CUKS (2007–08) in Kelaa of Essraghna
 Ecole Supérieure de Technologie (1992–93)
 Faculté Polydisciplinaire (2003–04)
 National School of Applied Sciences ENSA Safi (2003–04) in Safi
The number of students enrolled in Marrakesh is reported to be 41,669.

Astronomy 
Under the Morocco Oukaimeden Sky Survey (MOSS) Project, the University of Marrakesh discovered two major comets and one NEO, which resulted in the university gaining prestige by naming the asteroid 2007 NQ3 as Cadi Ayyad. The first discovery was comet P/2011 W2 (Rinner) on 25 November 2011 using a 500 mm telescope at the Oukaimeden Observatory. The second comet with the name  (MOSS) was discovered on 13 February 2011. A near-Earth asteroid was discovered on the night of 15 to 16 November 2011 using a MOSS telescope. A third comet was officially discovered in January 2013 was designated .

References

Bibliography

External links 
Official site

1978 establishments in Morocco
Educational institutions established in 1978
Universities in Morocco
Buildings and structures in Marrakesh
20th-century architecture in Morocco